Neelam Jain (born 26 August 1954) is a prominent woman in Jain society. She is the editor of Jain Mahiladarsh.

Career
She is Chief editor for the Shree Deshana. She is a research officer in Sahitya Bharati Shodh Sansthan. She is General Secretary of Sewayatan, Shri Sammedshikhar Ji. She is Founder of VAMA Jain Mahila Mandal, Gurgaon.
Neelam Jain is presently working for the overall development of the Sarak community in Bengal, Bihar and Orissa. She has been invited more than 1000 conferences worldwide as chief guest or as Main Speaker. She spread the Jain religion concepts all over the world. She has given more than 100 talks on different radio and TV channels (Aastha, Sanskar, Jain TV .. etc.). She is nominated State coordinator (Maharashtar, state) by National Minority Commission for Educational institutions, Govt. of India, New Delhi.

Recognition
 George Bernard Shaw Memorial Honour (1994)
 Dr. Laxmi Narain Award (1994)
 CHANDMAL Saraogi Gauhati Award (1994)
 Shrut Shri Award (1995)
 Dr. Ambedkar fellowship (1996)
 Sahitya-Sri (1997)
 Sahitya-Saraswati (1998)
 Sahitya Shiromani (1999)
 Saraswat Samman (1999)
 Acharya VidyaSagar Award (1995)
 Mahavir Award (1995)
 Special Writer & Social Worker Award (1997)
 Sarjan Award (1997)
 Sahu RamaDevi Award (1999)
 Jain Jyotsana (2000)
 Mahila-Ratna (2001)
 Shrawika Ratan Samman (2001)
 Mahila-Gaurav (2003)
 Maa-Jinvani Award (2009) 
 Vishav Maitri Samman (2009)
 Guru -Ashish Samman (2005)
 Saraswat Samman (2012)
 Aksharabhindan Samman (2012)
 Stri Shakti samman  (2015 )
sawyambhu puruskar (2016 )

Publication
 Sarak Kshetra ( Hindi)
 Mautti Mai Band Asmita ( Hindi)
 Samaaj Nirmaan Mai Mahilao Ka Yogdan ( Hindi )
 Man Mai Dharo Namokar ( Hindi)
 Maati Ka Saurabh ( Hindi )
 Namokar ( Barel Language For Blind )
 Dhumrapan – Zahar Hi Zahar ( Hindi )
 Sabhyata Ke Unnayak Bhagwan Rishabdev ( Hindi )
 Mile Sur Mera Tumhara ( Hindi )
 December Ke Digamber ( Hindi )
 Jain Varta ( Hindi )
 Tatvartha Surta : Ek Samajik Addhayan ( Hindi )
 Jain Loksahitya Main Nari (Hindi)
 Jain Religion and Science (English)

References

Living people
20th-century Indian Jains
Hindi-language writers
Journalists from Uttarakhand
1954 births
Indian women journalists
English-language writers from India
Indian religious writers
Women religious writers
Indian women columnists
Indian columnists
Indian women newspaper editors
Indian newspaper editors
20th-century Indian journalists
20th-century Indian women writers
Women writers from Uttarakhand
21st-century Indian Jains